This is a list of the most notable films produced in Cinema of Germany in the 1980s.

For an alphabetical list of articles on West German films see :Category:West German films.

1980

1981

1982

1983

1984

1985

1986

1987

1988

1989

References

External links
 German film at the Internet Movie Database (maintains separate lists for West Germany and East Germany)

1980s
German
Films